Kimberly Allise Hill is an American soul musician, best known for her work with the hip hop group the Black Eyed Peas.

Personal life 
Hill grew up in Camillus, New York, a small suburb outside Syracuse, New York. She was raised by her single mother in a primarily white neighborhood.

Hill is divorced and has one son. She also has a brother.

Career 
When Hill moved to Los Angeles, she found work as an extra on television for shows such as Living Single.

She joined Black Eyed Peas after meeting them backstage at a BMI showcase in 1995. She also signed to will.i.am's label I Am Music (an imprint of Interscope Records). Hill got to realize her childhood dream of performing on Soul Train when Black Eyed Peas were asked to perform in 1998. Hill signed a solo deal with Interscope Records in 1998, but she later ended up releasing the record on her own. As the merger of Interscope's parent company Universal Music Group and PolyGram took full effect, Hill resisted pressure by Interscope to over-sexualize her image. She left the band in 2000, and was later replaced by Fergie in 2002.

Hill has since begun performing as a solo artist, and she occasionally acts in indie projects.

Hill began DJing in 2008.

Hill crowdfunded her cosmetic line, Next of Kim, in November 2018.

Discography

Albums

Guest appearances

References

External links
Official website

African-American women singers
African-American songwriters
Living people
Black Eyed Peas members
Musicians from Syracuse, New York
University of the Arts (Philadelphia) alumni
21st-century American singers
21st-century American women singers
Year of birth missing (living people)